Konstantin Khasanovich Dzhussoev (born 23 November 1967) is a South Ossetian politician serving as the Prime Minister of South Ossetia since 2022.

Biography 
Dzhussoev graduated in 1989 from the Tskhinvali Faculty of the Georgian Polytechnic Institute (GPI) with a degree in technology of machine tools and tools. From 1993 to 2011 he held the position of general director of the construction company Prilichny. In 2011, he became the General Director of the construction company Megapolis.

Dzhussoev is married and has a daughter.

On 8 June 2022, the President of South Ossetia, Alan Gagloev, submitted a proposal to the parliament to appoint Dzhussoev as the prime minister of South Ossetia. On 17 June, the Parliament of South Ossetia approved the candidacy of Dzhussoev with all 33 deputies voting in favor. On 20 June, Gagloev signed a decree to confirm his appointment.

References 

1967 births
Living people
Ossetian politicians
Prime Ministers of South Ossetia